Craspedostomatidae is an extinct taxonomic family of fossil sea snails, marine, gastropod mollusks in the subclass Gastropoda incertae sedis, unassigned in the class Gastropoda .

Genera
 † Brochidium Koken, 1889 
 Bucanospira Ulrich and Scofield 1897
 Bucanospira contexta
 Bucanospira expansa
 Bucanospira fractum
 Bucanospira tuba
 Craspedostoma Lindström 1884
 Craspedostoma elegantulum
 Craspedostoma filistriatum
 Craspedostoma fugitivum
 Craspedostoma glabrum
 Craspedostoma involutum
 Craspedostoma spinulosum
 Craspedostoma tuba
 Natiria de Koninck 1881
 Natiria aequicostata
 Natiria americana
 Natiria costata
 Natiria gemmulata
 Natiria striatocostata
 Spirina Kayser 1889
 Spirina antiquata
 Spirina brilonensis
 Spirina patula
 Spirina squamata
 Spirina symmetrica
 Temnospira Perner 1903
 Temnospira monile
 Temnospira percinctum
 Tubospirina J. Frýda 1998 
 Tubospirina tubicina
 Umbonellina Koken and Perner 1925 
 Umbonellina infrasilurica

References

 Wenz, W. (1938-1944). Gastropoda. Teil 1: Allgemeiner Teil und Prosobranchia. xii + 1639 pp. In: Schindewolf, O.H. (Ed.) Handbuch der Paläozoologie, Band 6. Bornträger, Berlin. Lief. 1, 1-240 
 Bouchet P., Rocroi J.P., Hausdorf B., Kaim A., Kano Y., Nützel A., Parkhaev P., Schrödl M. & Strong E.E. (2017). Revised classification, nomenclator and typification of gastropod and monoplacophoran families. Malacologia. 61(1-2): 1-526

External links 
 Manual of Conchology, volume 10. page 17. plate 1, figure 18 Craspedostoma elegantulum